The Dulle Griet ("Mad Meg", named after the Flemish folklore figure Dull Gret) is a medieval large-calibre gun founded in Gent (Ghent).

History 
Three cannons were founded: one resides now in Edinburgh and is called "Mons Meg", and the last one was in France but has since been lost. The wrought-iron bombard was constructed in the first half of the 15th century from 32 longitudinal bars enclosed by 61 rings. In 1452, the bombard was employed by the city of Ghent in the siege of Oudenaarde, but fell into the hands of the defenders on the retreat and was only returned to Ghent in 1578. Today, the bombard is set up close to the Friday Market square in the old town.

Besides the Dulle Griet, a number of 15th-century European superguns are known to have been employed primarily in siege warfare, including the wrought-iron Pumhart von Steyr and Mons Meg as well as the cast-bronze Faule Mette, Faule Grete and Grose Bochse.

See also 
List of the largest cannon by caliber

Footnotes

References

External links 

Large-calibre artillery
History of Ghent
Individual cannons
Medieval artillery